Membrío is a municipality located in the province of Cáceres in Extremadura, Spain. According to the 2006 census (INE), the municipality has a population of 880 inhabitants.

Membrío is 66km away from the town of Cáceres and within 30km of the Portuguese border.

On August 15th, Membrío celebrates a holiday dedicated to Saint Mary: Our Lady of Grace. During the holidays, Membrío doubles and even triples its population, since emigrants from the village and their families return for a few days. Other notable membrillero festivities are the Carnival and Easter, when, following the southern Spanish tradition, the baroque church icons are taken into the streets.

References

External links 
popular photo album

Municipalities in the Province of Cáceres